The 2017 Finn Gold Cup was held in Balatonföldvár, Hungary 1–10 September 2017.

Results

References

Finn Gold Cup
Finn Gold Cup
Sailing competitions in Hungary
2017 in Hungarian sport